The Enggano people are an isolated, but contacted, tribe which inhabits Enggano Island. Enggano Island is a small island located adjacent to the southwest coast of Sumatra in Indonesia. The population of Enggano people is not closely tracked. As such, no population estimates beyond the year 2000 appear to exist. Furthermore, the estimates from 1990 and 2000 are not in agreement. The source for the year 2000 estimates that there were 1,500 Enggano people inhabiting the island. While the 1999 source estimates that there were approximately 1,000 Enggano people inhabiting the island. However, both sources agree that the population is likely to continue decreasing.

Language
The Enggano language belongs to the Northwest Sumatra–Barrier Islands subgroup of the Austronesian languages.

Origin and social structure

The Enggano people are one of the oldest tribes of Sumatra. They were first discovered by Portuguese explorers in the early 1500s and the Enggano people referred to themselves as E Lopeh people. Ethnically, they are closely related to the indigenous tribes of Java and Sumatra, from where migration flows directly to Enggano Island. The most anthropologically related people of the Enggano people are the Batak and Nias people and distantly related to the Lampung people (Abung and Pepaduan).

The social organization of the Enggano people largely resembles the social model of the Nias people and now retains the paternal features of the family. Rural communities are of a neighbor-large-family type. The main social unit is marga or merga (surname), an expanded genus whose members are descended from a common male ancestor and retain its name, usually legendary. Outsiders from other margas that came later also live in the settlement. Within the marga there are also saompu, large patriarchal families, where each of them occupies one house. A large family has land and is governed by its elder. Communities are governed by elective village councils.

It is thought that they strictly observe matrilineal exogamous traditions, where men and children of the village belong to the marga of their forefathers, while wives are taken from other marga. One cannot marry into the same marga or to a woman from the marga from which the groom's sister marries. But this is not exactly the case, as Enggano couples from the same clan are still allowed to married, provided they are of a different sub-clan. The core family unit in Enggano society is based on the monogamy marriage, as polygamy is strictly forbidden. Marriage settlement is patrilocal. A married woman passes into the family of her husband, takes on his surname, preserving it as her family name. The groom's father allocates a piece of land to his son, the child that receives the family name of his father.

Modern political orientation

Today, the Enggano people; due to prolonged cultural isolation, is on the verge of extinction. They are alien to the neighboring peoples, for example, unlike the Batak people in recent decades, the appearance and growth of ethnic self-awareness are prevalent, especially among the mainstream Indonesians.

Religion
Among the Enggano people, approximately equal of the population professes Islam (mainly Sunni) and Christianity (mainly Catholicism). Apart from that, there are places where animism, totemism and ancestral worship are still being preserved.

Traditional settlement
Enggano settlements are structurally cumulus. Their houses have stilt frames, stacked and rectangular in shape (whereas in the past, they were rounded), while the walls and roof are strengthened by rigid leaves.

Lifestyle
Enggano people engaged in manual farming (maize, yam, peanuts, taro, coconut palm), hunting for turtles, breeding of chickens and fishing. Handicrafts works are such as weaving, pottery, woodcarving, making  of masks and necklaces, weaving mats and ornaments from beads. Wood carvings by the Enggano people have a very strange resemblance to those in Polynesia.

Enggano men wear kain loincloths of various lengths, and the length of the kain in direct proportion testifies to the economic status of its wearer. Enggano women always wear long kain. Men's outer garment is a shirt with long sleeves and a blind collar, while women have a shirt without a collar.

Enggano food is mainly vegetable, and rice is usually bought.

See also

 Proto-Malay

References

Ethnic groups in Indonesia